Kurt Singer (11 October 1885 – 7 February 1944) was a German neurologist, musicologist, conductor and chairman of the Jüdischer Kulturbund. He was murdered in the Holocaust.

Life 
Born in Kościerzyna, Singer, son of a rabbi, spent his youth in Koblenz. After graduating from high school he studied medicine, psychology and musicology. In 1908, he received his doctorate in medicine and initially worked as a neurologist at the Berlin Charité.

He earned an Iron Cross for his gallantry in World War I.

Since 1910, he wrote music reviews. In 1913, he founded the Berliner Ärztechor, which he directed until the time of National Socialism. In 1923, he became professor at the Staatliche Akademische Hochschule für Musik, where he could teach as well as do research. Three years later, his work Die Berufskrankheiten der Musiker was published. From 1923 to 1932, Singer was head of the medical advisory service at the Academy of Music and gave lectures on occupational diseases of musicians. From 1927 to 1931, he was temporarily deputy and then director of the Deutsche Oper Berlin At the Academy of Music, he was dismissed in Autumn 1932 because of alleged financial difficulties. When, after the Machtergreifung in 1933, numerous musicians of Jewish origin lost their jobs in accordance with the Law for the Restoration of the Professional Civil Service, he founded the "jüdischen Kulturbund".

Singer emigrated to Amsterdam in 1938. He was arrested in 1943, first in the Westerbork transit camp, then  deported in the Theresienstadt Ghetto. He died there on 7 February 1944 as a result of the prison conditions at the age of 58.

The Kurt-Singer-Institut für Musikphysiologie und Musikergesundheit at the Hochschule für Musik "Hanns Eisler" and the Academy of Arts, Berlin are named after him.

Publications 
Articles:

in Gemeindeblatt der Juedischen Gemeinde zu Berlin:
 Die Welt des "Fidelio", Jg. 24. 1934, Nr. 41 (3 November 1934), S. 3
 Disput über Saint-Saëns' Oper "Samson und Dalila", Jg. 26. 1936, Nr. 11 (15 March 1936), S. 9
 Dr. Singer erklärt, Jg. 26. 1936, Nr. 21 (24 May 1936), S. 22
 Die nächste Kulturbund-Premiere, Jg. 26. 1936, Nr. 22 (31 May 1936), S. 9
 Kulturbund vor Gericht, Jg. 26. 1936, Nr. 27 (5 July 1936), S. 3
 Kulturbundbilanz 1936, Jg. 27. 1937, Nr. 1 (3y January 1937), S. 4
 Händels "Israel", Jg. 27. 1937, Nr. 6 (7 February 1937), S. 11
 Der Jüdische Kulturbund wirbt!, Jg. 27. 1937, Nr. 34 (22 August 1937), S. 3
 Wie organisieren wir das Hauskonzert?, Jg. 27. 1937, Nr. 39 (26 September 1937), S. 17
 "Wenn ich König wär", Jg. 28. 1938, Nr. 7 (13 February 1938), S. 5
 "Die schöne Helena", Jg. 28. 1938, Nr. 23 (5 June 1938), S. 7
 Hilfe für jüdische Autoren, Jg. 28. 1938, Nr. 40 (2 October 1938), S. 4

in the :
 Sozialistische Bewegung, Jg. 12. 1937, Nr. 23 (5 November 1937), 

 Further reading 
 Sophie Fetthauer: Kurt Singer in the Lexikon verfolgter Musiker und Musikerinnen der NS-Zeit (LexM)
 Gabriele Fritsch-Vivié: Kurt Singer. Arzt, Musiker und Gründer des Jüdischen Kulturbunds.'' Hentrich & Hentrich, Berlin 2018, .

References

External links 

 

German conductors (music)
German music critics
20th-century German musicologists
Academic staff of the Berlin University of the Arts
German choral conductors
German people who died in the Theresienstadt Ghetto
Jewish emigrants from Nazi Germany to the Netherlands
20th-century German physicians
German neurologists
1885 births
1944 deaths
People from Kościerzyna